Salem Abdullah Al-Jaber Al-Sabah is a Kuwaiti diplomat and current Minister of Foreign Affairs of Kuwait. He previously served as ambassador of Kuwait to the United States of America from June 2001 until May 2022.

Career 
Ambassador Al-Sabah has also been the ambassador of Kuwait to Korea (1998), minister plenipotentiary (1998) and first secretary to the Permanent Mission of the State of Kuwait to the United Nations, New York (1997-1998). 

From 1986 to 1991 he was the diplomatic attaché for the Office of the Minister of State for Foreign Affairs in Kuwait.

Personal life 
He speaks Arabic, English and French. He is married to Lebanese-born former journalist Sheikha Rima al-Sabah, whom he met in 1983 when both were students in Beirut. They married in 1988 and have four sons.

References 

Kuwaiti diplomats

Year of birth missing (living people)
Living people